Pantorhytes is a genus of true weevil family.

Species
 Pantorhytes albopunctulatus Heller, K.M., 1901
 Pantorhytes australasiae Faust, J., 1897
 Pantorhytes batesi Faust, J., 1892
 Pantorhytes biplagiatus Bates, H.W., 1877
 Pantorhytes carbonarius Heller, 1926
 Pantorhytes chrysomelas Faust, J., 1892
 Pantorhytes constellatus Heller, K.M., 1905
 Pantorhytes corallifer Heller, K.M., 1901
 Pantorhytes decempunctulatus Heller, K.M., 1901
 Pantorhytes decemverrucosus Heller, K.M., 1935
 Pantorhytes granulatus Heller, K.M., 1905
 Pantorhytes gravis Heller, K.M., 1914
 Pantorhytes melanostictus Heller, K.M., 1935
 Pantorhytes multipustulosus Heller, K.M., 1935
 Pantorhytes octopustulatus Heller, K.M., 1935
 Pantorhytes opacus Faust, J., 1899
 Pantorhytes papillosus Heller, K.M., 1901
 Pantorhytes papuanus Gestro, 1923
 Pantorhytes pilosus Heller, K.M., 1935
 Pantorhytes proximus Faust, J., 1899
 Pantorhytes quadriplagiatus Faust, J., 1892
 Pantorhytes quadripustulatus (Gestro, 1875)
 Pantorhytes rarus Heller, K.M., 1901
 Pantorhytes rubroverrucatus Tryon, 1891
 Pantorhytes salomonis Heller, K.M., 1901
 Pantorhytes sexpustulatus Heller, 1912
 Pantorhytes stanleyanus Heller, K.M., 1912
 Pantorhytes subcostatus Heller, K.M., 1905
 Pantorhytes torricellianus Heller, K.M., 1935
 Pantorhytes verrucatus Bates, H.W., 1877
 Pantorhytes vibicifer Heller, K.M., 1901

References 

 Encyclopaedia of Life
 Global Species
 Myers, P., R. Espinosa, C. S. Parr, T. Jones, G. S. Hammond, and T. A. Dewey. 2013.   The Animal Diversity Web (online) 
 Papua Insects
  The Genus Pantorhytes

Entiminae